Vainutas is a small town in Klaipėda County, in northwestern Lithuania. According to the 2011 census, the town has a population of 746 people.

History
During the Second World War, the Jewish community was assassinated in a mass execution perpetrated by an einsatzgruppen. There is a monument on the site of the massacre.

References

Towns in Lithuania
Towns in Klaipėda County
Holocaust locations in Lithuania